Jaan Rea (30 June 1896 Seli Parish (now Pärnu), Kreis Pernau – 1937 Soviet Union) was an Estonian politician. He was a member of II Riigikogu, representing the Workers' United Front. On 20 May 1924, he resigned his position and he was replaced by Jaan Velt.
 Rea participated in the preparations of the 1924 Estonian coup d'état attempt. After the failure of the coup attempt he fled to the Soviet Union.

References

1896 births
1937 deaths
People from Pärnu
People from Kreis Pernau
Workers' United Front politicians
Members of the Riigikogu, 1923–1926
Estonian emigrants to the Soviet Union